Joseph Debs (born 8 October 1833 in Raschiva, Lebanon - died on 7 October 1907 in Beirut, Lebanon) was an archeparch of the Maronite Catholic Archeparchy of Beirut.

Life

Joseph Debs was appointed and consecrated on 11 February 1872 by Maronite Patriarch of Antioch, Boulos I Massad, Archeparch of Beirut. On 7 October 1907 he died at the age of 73 years in Beirut.

References

External links

1833 births
1907 deaths
Lebanese Maronites
19th-century Maronite Catholic bishops
20th-century Maronite Catholic bishops